Moffat or Moffatt is a masculine given name which may refer to:

 Moffatt Burriss (1919–2019), American businessman and politician
 Moffat Johnston (1886–1935), Scottish actor
 Moffat Mtonga (born 1983), Zambian retired footballer
 Moffatt Oxenbould (born 1943), Australian opera director
 Moffat Takadiwa (born 1983), Zimbabwean visual artist

Masculine given names